Koo Ki-Lan (born March 10, 1977) is a retired female volleyball player who represented South Korea at the 2000 Summer Olympics in Sydney, Australia, when the women's national team finished in 8th place. Two years later, at the World Championship in Germany, she was named Best Digger and Best Receiver. She retired in 2008 due to injury.

Honours
 2000 FIVB World Grand Prix — 5th place
 2000 Olympic Games — 8th place
 2001 World Grand Champions Cup — 6th place
 2002 World Championship — 6th place
 2002 Asian Games — Silver medal
 2003 FIVB World Cup — 9th place

Individual awards
 2002 World Championship - "Best Digger"
 2002 World Championship - "Best Receiver"

References

External links
 FIVB Profile

1977 births
Living people
South Korean women's volleyball players
Volleyball players at the 2000 Summer Olympics
Olympic volleyball players of South Korea
Place of birth missing (living people)
Asian Games medalists in volleyball
Volleyball players at the 2002 Asian Games
Asian Games silver medalists for South Korea
Medalists at the 2002 Asian Games
Sportspeople from South Gyeongsang Province